Newcastle-under-Lyme  railway station was a railway station that served the town of Newcastle-under-Lyme, Staffordshire, England. It was opened by the North Staffordshire Railway in 1852.

The station was located on King Street opposite the Borough Arms Hotel. A small goods yard was located on Water Street. It was closed on 2 March 1964.

Present day
The site north of the station has been wiped away by new builds near the former Hartshill tunnel and Hartshill and Basford Halt. The cutting the station was located near has also been filled in and is now part of Station Walks which is a pedestrian and cyclist footpath but the tunnel and overbridges are still in place although a majority of the station site has been landscaped.

References

Further reading

Disused railway stations in Staffordshire
Railway stations in Great Britain closed in 1964
Railway stations in Great Britain opened in 1852
Newcastle-under-Lyme
Former North Staffordshire Railway stations
Beeching closures in England
1852 establishments in England